The Holyoke–French House is a historical house at Elm Street and Topsfield Road in Boxford, Massachusetts.  It is a -story wood-frame structure, with a side-gable gambrel roof, twin interior chimneys, clapboard siding, and a stone foundation.  The center entrance is flanked by pilasters and is topped by a transom window and a gabled pediment.

The first house on this site was built  as a parsonage for Boxford's first preacher, Thomas Symmes. The present house was built in 1760 for the third minister, Elizur Holyoke. This house (as the name suggests) is known for two of the families that resided there, the Holyokes and the Frenches. This house is now owned by the Boxford Historical Society. The house owner allows people to have a tour of it.

See also
National Register of Historic Places listings in Essex County, Massachusetts
List of the oldest buildings in Massachusetts

References

Houses in Boxford, Massachusetts
Clergy houses in the United States
Houses on the National Register of Historic Places in Essex County, Massachusetts
Historic house museums in Massachusetts